Xylota aeneimaculata is a species of hoverfly in the family Syrphidae.

Distribution
New Guinea.

References

Eristalinae
Insects described in 1908
Diptera of Asia
Taxa named by Johannes C. H. de Meijere